Arta Bajrami (born 9 January 1980) is a Kosovo-Albanian singer and songwriter. Born and raised in Pristina, she has been referred to as the "Albanian Queen of R&B" and is noted for her versatility in music and performance.

Life and career 

Bajrami was born on 9 January 1980 into an Albanian family in the city of Pristina, then part of the SFR Yugoslavia, present Kosovo. She is  popular among the young Albanian audience in Albania, Kosovo, Montenegro and North Macedonia. She has had the fortune of winning several music prizes in various Albanian music contests. She got married in 2009.

Bajrami grew up in a family where music was just as important as the daily food (Arta's father Zejnullah Bajrami is a famous Albanian rapsode). In a family of four, Arta's mother is the only member without a professional music background. Bajrami's younger brother Artan, known as Don Arbas in showbusiness, is an Albanian songwriter and producer. He runs Arbasound, a company known for producing many great songs by Albanian performers.

References 

1980 births
Living people
21st-century Albanian women singers